The 1958–59 Scottish Inter-District Championship was a  rugby union competition for Scotland's district teams.

This season saw the sixth formal Scottish Inter-District Championship.

South and Edinburgh District won the competition with two wins and a loss each.

1958-59 League Table

Results

Round 1

Glasgow District: 

South:

Round 2

North and Midlands: 

South:

Round 3

 Edinburgh District: 

North and Midlands:

Round 4

Glasgow District: 

Edinburgh District:

Round 5

Edinburgh District: 

South:

Round 6

North and Midlands: 

Glasgow District:

References

1958–59 in Scottish rugby union
Scottish Inter-District Championship seasons